Ciro Imparato (15 December 1962 – 18 March 2015) was an Italian psychologist, voice actor, actor, announcer and writer.

Works 
 Il manuale del lettore, 1997 Elledici,  
 La tua voce può cambiarti la vita, 2009 Sperling&Kupfer,  
 La voce verde della calma, 2013 Sperling&Kupfer,  
 Solo applausi, 2013 Sperling&Kupfer,

Acknowledgments 
 Melvin Jones Fellow "For Lions Dedicated Humanitarian Services Lions Clubs International Foundation" awarded by the Torino Sabauda Lions Club
 Audience Award at the 6th edition of the Leggio d'Oro (2009)

TV and radio conduction 
  ABC talk with the little ones  (Sky Issue Easy Baby, from 2011 onwards)
 24ore.tv, network entry
 Network4, network entry
  Open Studio – The Day  (Italy1)
  Frontiers of the Spirit  (Channel 5)

Dubbing 
Former student of Center D – Scuola di Dizione, dubbing and adaptation of dialogues, he was a member of the Association of Advertising Actors Doppers.

Television 
  Dragon Ball Z  (Elder wise)
  Donkey Kong Country  (Inka Dinka Doo)
  Max Steel  (Durham)

Animated film 
  Aida degli alberi  (Diaspron)

Videogames 
Microsoft Flight Simulator X
 Sly Raccoon (Panda King)
 Soulbringer (Barthelago)
 Imperivm (Ogox; Degedyc; Dahram; Thoric; Rulinix; Vigorius)
 Crash Nitro Kart (Tiny Tiger; Imperatore Velo)
 Sacred Underworld (Gargaduk; Subkari Ceriri; Fingoniel)
 Command & Conquer: Generals (Cannone quadruplo; Lanciatore Scud; Dirottatore)
 Mortal Kombat – Shaolin Monks (Scorpion; Jax Briggs; Voce narrante)
 Max Payne 2 – The Fall of Max Payne
 Warcraft III – Reign of Chaos (Mal'Ganis; Re dei Lich; Sciamano; Ombra; Emissario; Lavoratore)
 Aliens vs. Predator 2 (Duke)
 Ty the Tasmanian Tiger (Nandu-Kili; Ranger Ken)
 God of War II (Re arbaro, Atlante)
 The Hobbit (Bombur)
 Stranglehold (Vladimir Zakarov)
 Aida degli alberi (Diaspron)
 Syphon Filter 2 (Vincent Hadden, Derek Falkan)
 Syphon Filter 3 (Vincent Hadden)
 Steel 2000 (Durham)
 Age of Mythology 
 The Movies (DJ Randy Shaw)

References 

1962 births
2015 deaths
Actors from Turin
Italian psychologists
Italian male voice actors
Italian male video game actors
People in health professions from Turin